Dernière Volonté (Last Will, in English) is the name under which French musician Geoffroy D writes his own music. Throughout an 'industrial' early period, Geoffroy tended to write a fusion of martial music and dark ambient. Choosing to focus on atmosphere, militaristic rhythms, and historical samples, he left little emphasis to be placed on vocals and melody. However, with the release of his 2003 effort, Les Blessures de l'Ombre, Geoffroy took a new direction, applying his martial style to verse-chorus song structures and pop melodies. In 2008, Geoffroy started an electronic side-project called Position Parallèle which fused together EBM with minimal wave style sounds. This led to a more distinctly synthpop sound being carried over into his work as Dernière Volonté as well. His 2016 album, Prie Pour Moi, shifted his sound toward more neofolk instrumentation with less emphasis on synthesizers. A new Position Parallèle album, titled En Garde à Vue, was released in 2017.

Geoffroy is featured as a guest artist on the Der Blutharsch albums, with Nový Svět and Die Krupps. The band still plays occasional live shows.

Discography

Studio albums
Obeir et Mourir (1998)
Le Feu Sacré (2000)
Les Blessures de l'Ombre (2003)
Devant le Miroir (2006)
Immortel (2010)
Mon Meilleur Ennemi (2012)
Prie Pour Moi (2016)
Frontière (2019)
Eh toi! (2019)
La Petite Mort (2021)

Compilations
Commémoration (2004)
Ne Te Retourne Pas (2012)

Singles & EPs
En Avant! (1999)
Commandements (2000)
Où Tu Iras (2001)
Mon Mercenaire! / El Continent! - with Nový Svět (2002)
Untitled - with Der Blutharsch (2006)
Le Cheval de Troie (2007)
Toujours (2007)
La Nuit Revient (2008)

Side Projects
Blasterkorps – Blasterkorps (1997)
Blasterkorps – La Justice des Hommes: Chapitre I (2003)
Blasterkorps – La Justice des Hommes: Chapitre II (2003)
Position Parallèle – Position Parallèle (2008)
Position Parallèle – Néons Blancs (2013)
Blasterkorps – Nos Années Mortes: 1996/2002 (2015)
Position Parallèle – En Garde à Vue (2017)
Position Parallèle – Escalier de Service (2018)
Position Parallèle – Mélodies en Sous-Sols (2020)

External links
 Official Myspace site
 Discogs

French musical groups